Birgir Sigurðsson may refer to:

 Birgir Sigurðsson (writer) (born 1937), Icelandic writer
 Birgir Sigurðsson (handballer) (born 1965), Icelandic former handball player